The CB&SCR Baldwin saddle tank was a class of two of  locomotives purchased by the Cork, Bandon and South Coast Railway (CB&SCR), being the first purchase of locomotives for Ireland from America.  With a service life of 14 years or less the purchase probably would not be termed a success.

History
In January 1900, the CBSCR accepted an offer to supply two goods locomotives at a cost of £2575 from Burnham Williams & Co (Baldwins), the first purchase of a locomotive for Ireland from America, supply from British builders proving expensive with quotes between £3,000 and £3,600 in the context of a time of high demand and strikes,  The first was performing trial trips in October but there were problems with weight and weak frames, a compensation of £100 from Baldwins being accepted.  The CB&SCR decided to alter the brakes blackes, which all applied to the front of each driving wheel, so that the last pair had the blocks applied on the rear. Other alterations included replacing "annoying" whistles; open footsteps with "standard" Bandon ones; and the relocation of sandboxes from the saddle tank. A. J. Chisholm, writing in the Railway Magazine said he had observed No. 19 of them shunting in Cork and described it as an "ungainly looking machine" and terming it a "Yankee".

By as soon as 1908 chief engineer Johnstone (junior) doubted the locomotives would last four more years, No. 20 being sold for scrap in 1912, while No. 19 was noted in traffic hauling a special goods in 1914.  Shepherd remarks "whilst the purchase of these engines was regarded as a necessity at the time, they proved to be a poor bargain."

References

Notes

Footnotes

Sources
 
 
 

Baldwin locomotives
0-6-0ST locomotives
Steam locomotives of Ireland
5 ft 3 in gauge locomotives
Railway locomotives introduced in 1900
Scrapped locomotives